Zborowski (feminine form: Zborowska, plural: Zborowscy) of the Jastrzębiec coat of arms was a Polish noble family from Greater Poland, It played a significant role in Polish politics in the 16th century.

The first known member of the family was Marcin Zborowski (1492-1565), castellan and voivode. The main line died out with his grandson, Aleksander Zborowski, in 1621.

The most notable events in the family's history revolve around their feud with Chancellor and Hetman Jan Zamoyski. Zamoyski's execution of Samuel Zborowski in 1584 caused much uproar in the Polish–Lithuanian Commonwealth and intensified the feud. It culminated in the military conflict of the War of the Polish Succession (1587–1588), which ended with Zamoyski's victory and Zborowski's loss.

Coat of arms
The House of Zborowski used the Jastrzębiec coat of arms.

Notable members

"Main"-line
 Marcin Zborowski (died after 1488), starost of Odolanów and burgrave of Kraków  
 Andrzej Zborowski (died c. 1509), castellan of Żarnów, married Elżbieta Szydłowiecka h. Odrowąż
 Marcin Zborowski (1492-1565), voivode of Kalisz and Poznań, married Anna Konarska z Góry h. Abdank 
 Marcin Zborowski (died 1599), castellan of Krzywin, married Urszula Rozdrażewska h. Doliwa
 Piotr Zborowski (died 1580), voivode of Sandomierz and Kraków, married Barbara Myszkowska h. Jastrzębiec
 Jan Zborowski (1538-1603), castellan of Gniezno, Hetman, married NN Maltzan, Elzbieta Pronska and Katarzyna Konarska h. Abdank
 Elżbieta Zborowska (died before 1615), married voivode of Łęczyca Adam Sędziwój Czarnkowski h. Nałęcz and starost of Gniezno Piotr Opaliński h. Łodzia
 Zofia Zborowska (died before 1618), married Abraham Sieniuta z Lachowic h. Sieniuta and castellan of Troki Jerzy Radziwiłł h. Trąby
 Andrzej Zborowski (died 1598), Court Marshall of the Crown, married Barbara Jordan h. Trąby
 Andrzej Zborowski (c. 1583-1630), Count of Melsztyn, castellan of Oświęcim, married Anna Trach z Brzezia
 Marcin Deresław Zborowski (died 1639) courtier, married Jadwiga Padniewska
 Krystyna Zborowska (died c. 1643), married voivode of Lublin and Sandomierz Jan Aleksander Tarło h. Topór 
 Marianna Zborowska (died before 1597), married castellan of Poznań Krzysztof Tuczyński h. Tuczyński
 Krzysztof Zborowski (died 1593), podczaszy of the Crown
 Samuel Zborowski (died 1584), Royal Rotmistrz, married Zofia Jordan h. Trąby
 Aleksander Zborowski (died c. 1636), starost of Międzyrzecze, married Magdalena Fredro h. Bończa
 Konstancja Zborowska z Rytwian, married castellan of Lwów Rafał Grochowski h. Junosza
 Anna Zborowska, married voivode of Pomorze Ludwik Mortęski h. Mortęski
 Katarzyna Zborowska (died 1587), married castellan of Sandomierz Hieronim Ossoliński h. Topór
 Elżbieta Zborowska (died 1601), married Jan Amor Tarnowski h. Leliwa
 Krystyna Zborowska (c. 1540-1588), married  Hetman Jan Hieronim Chodkiewicz h. Kościesza
 Piotr Zborowski (died 1553), krajczy and podczaszy of the Crown, castellan of Sandomierz
 Zofia Zborowska (died 1545), married starost of Wieluń Stanisław Kurozwęcki h. Poraj and Royal secretary Hieronim Szafraniec z Piaskowej Skały h. Starykoń

"Count"-line
 Józef Ignacy Zborowski (born on the 17th century), married Juliana Fredro h. Bończa
 Count Maksymilian Zborowski ze Zborowa (born c. 1730), owner of Wielopole, married Petronela Janota Bzowska h. Ostoja
 Count Seweryn Maksymilian Zborowski ze Zborowa (1779–1846), owner of Dębowiec estates, married Franciszka Miroszewska h. Ślepowron
 Count Prosper Maksymilian Zborowski ze Zborowa (1807–1872), owner of Dębowiec estates, married Emilia Wodzicka h. Wodzicki and Barbara Bobrowska h. Jastrzębiec
 Count Jan Zborowski (1862–1914), owner of Zgłobice estates, married Helena Męcinska h. Poraj
 Count Aleksander Zborowski (1901–1979), was owner of Partyń estates, married Maria Ziemińska and Zofia Tur Przedmirska h. Łuk

References 
 Lucjan Siemieński Pamiątki o Samuelu Zborowskim, Poznań 1844
 Żegota Pauli Pamiątki do życia i sprawy Samuela i Krzysztofa Zborowskich, Lwów 1846